Kim Grant (born 1 May 1971) is a former professional South African tennis player. Her career-high WTA rankings are 414 in singles, achieved on 31 July 1995, and 76 in doubles, set on 6 May 2002.

WTA Tour career finals

Doubles: 1 runner-up

ITF Circuit finals

Singles (0–1)

Doubles (10–12)

External links
 
 
 Kim Grant's High Performance Tennis Training and Summer Camp

1971 births
Living people
People from Klerksdorp
South African people of British descent
South African expatriates in the United States
South African female tennis players
People from Atherton, California
White South African people